Ocean heat content (OHC) is the energy absorbed and stored by oceans. Between 1971 and 2018, the rise in OHC accounts for over 90% of Earth’s excess thermal energy from global heating. The main driver of this OHC increase was most likely anthropogenic forcing via rising greenhouse gas emissions.  By 2020, about one third of the added energy had propagated to depths below 700 meters.  Ocean heat content and sea level rise are important indicators of climate change. The term is used in oceanography and climatology.

Ocean water absorbs solar energy efficiently and has far greater heat capacity than atmospheric gases. As a result, the top few meters of the ocean contain more thermal energy than the entire Earth's atmosphere. Since before 1960, research vessels and stations have sampled sea surface temperatures and temperatures at greater depth all over the world. Furthermore, since the year 2000, an expanding network of nearly 4000 Argo robotic floats has measured temperature anomalies, or the change in OHC. OHC has been increasing at a steady or accelerating rate since at least 1990. The uncertainty is primarily due to the challenges of making multidecadal measurements with sufficient accuracy and spatial coverage. 

Changes in ocean heat content have far-reaching consequences for the planet's marine and terrestrial ecosystems; including multiple impacts to coastal ecosystems and communities.  Direct effects include variations in sea level and sea ice, shifts in intensity of the water cycle, and the migration and extinction of marine life.

In 2022, the world’s oceans, as given by OHC, were again the hottest in the historical record and exceeded the previous 2021 record maximum.

Definition

Ocean heat content is "the total amount of heat stored by the oceans". In order to calculate the ocean heat content, measurements of ocean temperature at many different locations and depths are required. 

The areal density of ocean heat content between two depths is defined as a definite integral:

In SI units,  has units of Joules per square metre (J·m−2).

In practice, the integral can be approximated by summation of a smooth and otherwise well-behaved sequence of temperature and density data.  Seawater density is a function of temperature, salinity, and pressure.  Despite the cold and great pressure at ocean depth,  water is nearly incompressible and favors the liquid state for which its density is maximized.

Measurements of temperature versus ocean depth generally show an upper mixed layer (0–200 m), a thermocline (200–1500 m), and a deep ocean layer (>1500 m).  These boundary depths are only rough approximations.  Sunlight penetrates to a maximum depth of about 200 m; the top 80 m of which is the habitable zone for photosynthetic marine life covering over 70% of Earth's surface.  Wave action and other surface turbulence help to equalize temperatures throughout the upper layer.

Unlike surface temperatures which decrease with latitude, deep-ocean temperatures are relatively cold and uniform in most regions of the world. About 50% of all ocean volume is at depths below 3000 m (1.85 miles), with the Pacific Ocean being the largest and deepest of five oceanic divisions.  The thermocline is the transition between upper and deep layers in terms of temperature, nutrient flows, abundance of life, and other properties. It is semi-permanent in the tropics, variable in temperate regions (often deepest during the summer), and shallow to nonexistent in polar regions.

Integrating the areal density of ocean heat over an ocean basin, or entire ocean, gives the total heat content, as indicated in the figure at left.  Thus, total ocean heat content is a volume integral of the product of temperature, density, and heat capacity over the three-dimensional region of the ocean for which data is available.  The bulk of measurements have been performed at depths shallower than about 2000 m (1.25 miles).

Causes for heat uptake
The more abundant equatorial solar irradiance which is absorbed by Earth's tropical surface waters drives the overall poleward propagation of ocean heat.  The surface also exchanges energy with the lower troposphere, and thus responds to long-term changes in cloud albedo, greenhouse gases, and other factors in the Earth's energy budget.  Over time, a sustained imbalance in the budget enables a net flow of heat either into or out of ocean depth via thermal conduction, downwelling, and upwelling.

Oceans are Earth's largest thermal reservoir that function to regulate the planet's climate; acting as both a sink and a source of energy.  Releases of OHC to the atmosphere occur primarily via evaporation and enable the planetary water cycle.   Concentrated releases in association with high sea surface temperatures help drive tropical cyclones, atmospheric rivers, atmospheric heat waves and other extreme weather events that can penetrate far inland.

The ocean also functions as a sink and source of carbon, with a role comparable to that of land regions in Earth's carbon cycle.  In accordance with the temperature dependence of Henry's law, warming surface waters are less able to absorb atmospheric gases including the growing emissions of carbon dioxide and other greenhouse gases from human activity.   Warming of the deep ocean has the further potential to melt and release some of the vast store of frozen methane hydrate deposits that have naturally accumulated there. Deep-ocean warming below 2000 m has been largest in the Southern Ocean compared to other ocean basins.

Warming oceans are one reason for coral bleaching and contribute to the migration of marine species. Marine heat waves are regions of life-threatening and persistently elevated water temperatures. Redistribution of the planet's internal energy by atmospheric circulation and ocean currents produces internal climate variability, often in the form of irregular oscillations, and helps to sustain the global thermohaline circulation.

The increase in OHC accounts for 30–40% of global sea-level rise from 1900 to 2020 because of thermal expansion.
It is also an accelerator of sea ice, iceberg, and tidewater glacier melting. The ice loss reduces polar albedo, amplifying both the regional and global energy imbalances. 
The resulting ice retreat has been rapid and widespread for Arctic sea ice, and within northern fjords such as those of Greenland and Canada.
Impacts to Antarctic sea ice and the vast Antarctic ice shelves which terminate into the Southern Ocean have varied by region and are also increasing due to warming waters.  Breakup of the Thwaites Ice Shelf and its West Antarctica neighbors contributed about 10% of sea-level rise in 2020.

Recent observations and changes 

Numerous independent studies in recent years have found a multi-decadal rise in OHC of upper ocean regions that has begun to penetrate to deeper regions. The upper ocean (0–700 m) has warmed since 1971, while it is very likely that warming has occurred at intermediate depths (700–2000 m) and likely that deep ocean (below 2000 m) temperatures have increased. The heat uptake results from a persistent warming imbalance in Earth's energy budget that is most fundamentally caused by the anthropogenic increase in atmospheric greenhouse gases. There is very high confidence that increased ocean heat content in response to anthropogenic carbon dioxide emissions is essentially irreversible on human time scales.

Studies based on Argo measurements indicate that ocean surface winds, especially the subtropical trade winds in the Pacific Ocean, change ocean heat vertical distribution. This results in changes among ocean currents, and an increase of the subtropical overturning, which is also related to the El Niño and La Niña phenomenon. Depending on stochastic natural variability fluctuations, during La Niña years around 30% more heat from the upper ocean layer is transported into the deeper ocean.

Model studies indicate that ocean currents transport more heat into deeper layers during La Niña years, following changes in wind circulation. Years with increased ocean heat uptake have been associated with negative phases of the interdecadal Pacific oscillation (IPO). This is of particular interest to climate scientists who use the data to estimate the ocean heat uptake.

A study in 2015 concluded that ocean heat content increases by the Pacific Ocean were compensated by an abrupt distribution of OHC into the Indian Ocean.

The upper ocean heat content in most North Atlantic regions is dominated by heat transport convergence (a location where ocean currents meet), without large changes to temperature and salinity relation.

Although the upper 2000 m of the oceans have experienced warming on average since the 1970s, the rate of ocean warming varies regionally with the subpolar North Atlantic warming more slowly and the Southern Ocean taking up a disproportionate large amount of heat due to anthropogenic greenhouse gas emissions.

Contribution to ocean reanalysis and state estimation

Measurement networks

Ocean heat content can be estimated using measurements obtained by a Nansen bottle, bathythermograph, CTD, or ocean acoustic tomography.  Sea surface temperatures are also measured by collections of moored and drifting buoys, such as those deployed by the Global Drifter Program and the National Data Buoy Center.  The World Ocean Database Project is the largest database for temperature profiles from all of the world’s ocean.

Argo is an international program of robotic profiling floats deployed globally since the start of the 21st century.  
The program's initial 3000 units had expanded to nearly 4000 units by year 2020.  At the start of each 10-day measurement cycle, a float descends to a depth of 1000 meters and drifts with the current there for nine days.
It then descends to 2000 meters and measures temperature, salinity (conductivity), and depth (pressure)  over a final day of ascent to the surface.
At the surface the float transmits the depth profile and horizontal position data through satellite relays before repeating the cycle.

A smaller test fleet of "deep Argo" floats aims to extend the measurement capability down to about 6000 meters.  It will accurately sample OHC parameters for a majority of the ocean volume when fully deployed.

Starting 1992, the TOPEX/Poseidon and subsequent Jason satellite series have observed vertically integrated OHC, which is a major component of sea level rise.  The partnership between Argo and Jason measurements has yielded ongoing improvements to estimates of OHC and other global ocean properties.

Ocean heat content measurements come with difficulties, especially before the deployment of the Argo profiling floats. Due to poor spatial coverage and poor quality of data, it has not always been easy to distinguish between long term global warming trends and climate variability. Examples of these complicating factors are the variations caused by El Niño–Southern Oscillation or changes in ocean heat content caused by major volcanic eruptions.

See also
Ocean acidification
Ocean stratification
Special Report on the Ocean and Cryosphere in a Changing Climate
Tropical cyclones and climate change

References

External links 
 NOAA Global Ocean Heat and Salt Content

Meteorological concepts
Climate change
Climatology
Earth
Earth sciences
Environmental science
Oceanography
Articles containing video clips